James Smith (September 17, 1719  – July 11, 1806), a Founding Father of the United States, was an Irish/American lawyer and a signer to the United States Declaration of Independence as a representative of Pennsylvania.

He was born in Ireland; his family immigrated to Chester County, Pennsylvania, in 1729. Smith attended the Philadelphia Academy. He studied law at the office of his brother George and was admitted to the bar in Pennsylvania, initially practicing near Shippensburg and later near York.  He became captain of the militia there. He was appointed to the provincial convention in Philadelphia in 1775, to the state constitutional convention in 1776, and was elected to the Continental Congress, where he signed the Declaration of Independence. He was reelected to Congress in 1785 but declined to attend because of his advanced age.

Smith died on July 11, 1806, and is buried in York, Pennsylvania, First Presbyterian Churchyard. The University of Delaware has a dormitory on its North Campus bearing his name.

See also
 Memorial to the 56 Signers of the Declaration of Independence

References

 Lawyers and Leaders: The Role of Lawyers in the Development of York County, Pennsylvania, 2005, York County Bar Association by Georg R. Sheets

External links
 http://www.libraryireland.com/biography/JamesSmith.php
 Biography by Rev. Charles A. Goodrich, 1856
 

1719 births
1806 deaths
People from Ulster
American Presbyterians
Presbyterians from Pennsylvania
American people of Scotch-Irish descent
Continental Congressmen from Pennsylvania
18th-century American politicians
Signers of the United States Declaration of Independence
Foundrymen
Irish writers
University of Pennsylvania alumni
Politicians from York, Pennsylvania
People from Chester County, Pennsylvania
18th-century Irish people
19th-century Irish people
Founding Fathers of the United States